Cape Russell is a rock cape in Terra Nova Bay along the coast of Victoria Land, forming the south extremity of the Northern Foothills. Named by Advisory Committee on Antarctic Names (US-ACAN) for Lieutenant Commander R.E. Russell, U.S. Navy, officer in charge of the helicopter unit aboard the icebreaker Glacier in this area during U.S. Navy Operation Deepfreeze, 1958–59.
 

Headlands of Victoria Land
Scott Coast